This is a list of bassists who also sing or sang lead vocals for their respective bands. All bassists are the lead vocalist for their band unless otherwise noted. Only bands where lead vocals were sung are listed.

References

Lists of musicians